The 1928 Miami Hurricanes football team represented the University of Miami for the 1928 college football season. The Hurricanes played their home games at Moore Park in Miami, Florida. The team was coached by Cub Buck, in his second varsity season, the final year as head coach for the Hurricanes.

Schedule

References

Miami
Miami Hurricanes football seasons
Miami Hurricanes football